Fernando Henrique may refer to:

 Fernando Henrique Cardoso (born 1931), Brazilian politician, former president of Brazil
 Fernando Henrique (footballer, born 1983) (Fernando Henrique dos Anjos), Brazilian goalkeeper
 Fernando (footballer, born 1967) (Fernando Henrique Mariano), Brazilian footballer
 Nando (footballer, born 1990) (Fernando Henrique Quintela Cavalcante), Brazilian footballer
 Fernando Henrique (footballer, born 2001) (Fernando Henrique Pereira), Brazilian footballer